= Mu'taridah =

- Location within United Arab Emirates
- Coordinates: 25°30′0″N 56°6′0″E
- Country: United Arab Emirates
- Emirate: Fujairah
- Elevation: 217 m (712 ft)

Mu'taridah is a remote mountain settlement in Fujairah, United Arab Emirates.
